Criollas de Caguas is a Puerto Rican women's professional volleyball team founded in 1981. The team is based in Caguas, Puerto Rico.

History
The team was founded in 1980.

Team

2022

Previous

Honours 
Liga de Voleibol Superior Femenino
Champions (14) : 1996–1998, 2000–2002, 2005, 2011, 2014, 2015, 2016,
2017, 2019, 2021

Notable players 
 Micaya White
 Annerys Vargas
  Cosiri Rodríguez
  Jessica Jones
  Regan Hood
  Diane Copenhagen

References

External links
 League website
 Team website

Puerto Rican volleyball clubs
Volleyball clubs established in 1981